Tigania West Constituency is an electoral constituency in Kenya. It is one of nine constituencies of Meru County. The constituency has five wards, all of which elect Members of County Assembly (MCAs) for the Meru County Assembly. The constituency was established for the 1997 elections.

It was one of four constituencies of the former Meru North District.

Members of Parliament

Kitheo location

References 

Constituencies in Meru County
Constituencies in Eastern Province (Kenya)
1997 establishments in Kenya
Constituencies established in 1997